Nicolás Sosa Sánchez (born 6 April 1996), also known as "NicKiller," is a Uruguayan professional footballer who plays as a forward for Primera División Uruguaya club River Plate.

"NicKiller" represented his team, León, in the first edition of the eLiga MX, an eSports tournament with the FIFA 20 game. In the Final, he beat Santiago Cáseres who represented América, making León the first Champion of the Tournament.

Honours 
León
 eLiga MX: 2020
 Liga MX: Guardianes 2020

References

External links
Nicolás Sosa at playmakerstats.com (English version of ceroacero.es)

Cerro Largo F.C. players
Racing Club de Montevideo players
Club Atlético River Plate (Montevideo) players
Uruguayan Primera División players
Uruguayan Segunda División players
Uruguayan footballers
Association football forwards
1996 births
Living people